Andy Ram and Vera Zvonareva were the defending champions but Zvonareva did not compete. Ram partnered with Nathalie Dechy but lost in the third round to Marcin Matkowski and Cara Black.

Jamie Murray and Jelena Janković defeated Jonas Björkman and Alicia Molik in the final, 6–4, 3–6, 6–1 to win the mixed doubles tennis title at the 2007 Wimbledon Championships. Murray became the first British champion of a senior Wimbledon title  since Jeremy Bates and Jo Durie won the same title at the 1987 Championships. This was the first and only Grand Slam title won by Janković in her career, and she became the first Serbian female tennis player to win a Grand Slam tournament.

Seeds
All seeds received a bye into the second round. 

  Mike Bryan /  Lisa Raymond (second round)
  Bob Bryan /  Samantha Stosur (third round, withdrew)
  Mark Knowles /  Yan Zi (second round)
  Kevin Ullyett /  Liezel Huber (second round)
  Jonas Björkman /  Alicia Molik (final)
  Simon Aspelin /  Mara Santangelo (second round)
  Andy Ram /  Nathalie Dechy (third round)
  Leander Paes /  Meghann Shaughnessy (quarterfinals)
  Marcin Matkowski /  Cara Black (quarterfinals)
  Pavel Vízner /  Květa Peschke (third round)
  Daniel Nestor / Elena Likhovtseva (semifinals)
  Todd Perry /  Chuang Chia-jung (third round)
  Rogier Wassen /  Chan Yung-jan (third round)
  Julian Knowle /  Sun Tiantian (third round)
  Jonathan Erlich /  Elena Vesnina (second round)
  Paul Hanley /  Tatiana Perebiynis (third round)

Draw

Finals

Top half

Section 1

Section 2

Bottom half

Section 3

Section 4

References

External links

2007 Wimbledon Championships on WTAtennis.com
2007 Wimbledon Championships – Doubles draws and results at the International Tennis Federation

X=Mixed Doubles
Wimbledon Championship by year – Mixed doubles